Bianca Milesi Mojon (May 22, 1790 – June 8, 1849)  was an Italian patriot, writer and painter. She also trained girls to become interested in the arts.

Biography
Bianca Milesi was born into a family of wealthy merchants in Milan, daughter of Giovan Battista Milesi and Elena Viscontini. She had four sisters, Antoinette, Francesca, Agostina, Louise, and a brother, Charles, who would join in marriage with his cousin Elena Viscontini, sister of Matilda. She was brought up from six to ten years in a convent in Florence, in Milan in the monasteries of St. Sophia and the Holy Spirit, and finally with a governess. A journey made together with her mother in Tuscany and Switzerland gave her the opportunity to broaden her horizons and study the philosophy of the Enlightenment.

Even after returning to Milan, she continued to travel, periodically visiting Florence and Rome. In Florence he met the Countess of Albany Princess Louise of Stolberg-Gedern, who had been the mistress of Vittorio Alfieri. In Rome she came into relationship with Antonio Canova and the German painter Sophie Reinhard.

She had a leading role in the Carbonari uprisings in Milan in 1821. She later went on to become a drawer and painter, and taught at schools, particularly training girls to become interested in the arts. She died in Paris on June 8, 1849.

Sources
 Souvestre Émile Blanche Milesi-Mojon. Biographical Angers, Cosnier and Lachèse 1854
 Carlo Cattaneo, Bianca Milesi Mojon, in published and unpublished works: literary works, Florence, Le Monnier, 1925, p. 474-492
 Maria Teresa Mori, Salotti. 2003. The Sociability of the Elite in Italy in the Nineteenth Century. Rome, Carocci
 Arianna Arisi Rota, Milesi, Bianca, in Biographical Dictionary of Italian, vol. 74, Rome, Italian Encyclopedia Institute, 2010
 Boneschi, Marta. 2010. La donna segreta: storia di Metilde Viscontini Dembowski. Venezia: Marsilio. 

1790 births
1849 deaths
Painters from Milan
18th-century Italian painters
19th-century Italian painters
Italian women writers
Italian writers
19th-century Italian women artists
19th-century Italian women writers
Writers from Milan